Arnold George "Peewee" Hauser (September 25, 1888 – May 22, 1966) was a German American shortstop in Major League Baseball.

Hauser, after starting for the St. Louis Cardinals in 1911 and 1912, was befallen with a series of personal tragedies when in short succession his father and mother died, two children were burned to death in a fire, and his wife died. The tragedies, which took place over the course of just a few weeks, pushed Hauser to the edge of mental breakdown and essentially wrecked Hauser's career.

After being out of baseball for most of 1913 and all of the 1914 season, Hauser unsuccessfully attempted to come back with the Cardinals in 1915. Failing to land with the Cardinals, Hauser played 23 games for the Chicago Whales of the Federal League, ending his career on September 29, 1915.

Hauser was called a "quiet, gentlemanly little chap" and was regarded as a promising talent. During his interrupted 1913 season, Hauser hit a career-best .289 in 22 games played.

Footnotes

External links

1888 births
1966 deaths
Baseball players from Chicago
Major League Baseball shortstops
St. Louis Cardinals players
Chicago Whales players
Dubuque Dubs players